Sebastian Kollar (born 23 February 1987) is a Swiss former professional footballer who played as defensive midfielder. He was part of the 2006–07 Swiss Championship winning team. He moved to FC Wil on 4 April 2008.

External links
 
 

1987 births
Living people
Association football midfielders
Swiss men's footballers
FC Zürich players
FC Basel players
FC Wil players
FC St. Gallen players
Swiss Super League players